Silverthorn may refer to:

Silverthorn (album), an album by Kamelot
Silverthorn (novel), a novel by Raymond E. Feist
Silverthorn, Toronto, a neighbourhood in Toronto
Silverthorn Collegiate Institute
Silverthorn, a character on The Girl from Tomorrow
Elaeagnus pungens, a species of flowering plant in the family Elaeagnaceae

People with the surname
Merwin H. Silverthorn (1896–1985), United States Marine Corps general
Willis C. Silverthorn (1838–1916), American lawyer, judge, banker, politician and businessman

See also
Silverthorne, Colorado
Silverthorne (microprocessor)
Silverthorne (surname)